Victor Feddersen (born 31 January 1968) is a Danish competition rower, Olympic champion and world record holder.

Feddersen won a gold medal in lightweight coxless four at the 1996 Summer Olympics. He was member of the Gold Four that set a world record in 1999, with the time 5:45.60 (on 2000 metres).

References

1968 births
Danish male rowers
Olympic rowers of Denmark
Rowers at the 1996 Summer Olympics
Rowers at the 2000 Summer Olympics
Olympic gold medalists for Denmark
Olympic bronze medalists for Denmark
Living people
Olympic medalists in rowing
Medalists at the 2000 Summer Olympics
Medalists at the 1996 Summer Olympics
World Rowing Championships medalists for Denmark